Jacob Tobia (born August 7, 1991) is an American LGBT rights activist, writer, producer, television host, and actor. In 2019, they published their memoir titled Sissy: A Coming-of-Gender Story. They are also the voice of Double Trouble in DreamWorks' animated series She-Ra and the Princesses of Power. Tobia has been recognized in Forbes 30 Under 30 and Out100.

Early life and education
Tobia's grandparents were Syrians who immigrated to the United States in the 1950s and spoke Arabic, which Tobia says is "the language that I do not speak but wish I could." Tobia was raised in Raleigh, North Carolina, by a Methodist family. They graduated in 2010 from Raleigh Charter High School, serving as president of the Gay-Straight Alliance and being active in student government. Tobia applied to Harvard University and was accepted, but chose to attend Duke University instead, where they graduated summa cum laude with a degree in Human Rights Advocacy. While a student at Duke, Tobia served as the vice president of equity and outreach for Duke Student Government, was co-president of Blue Devils United, and was president of Duke Students for Gender Neutrality.

Career and activism
Tobia is a Point Foundation Scholar, Harry S. Truman Scholar, and a recipient of the Campus Pride National Voice and Action Award. Their writing has been featured on MSNBC, MTV, The Huffington Post, The Washington Post, The New York Times, The Guardian, BuzzFeed, Jezebel, and other media outlets. They've also served on conference panels and spoken at Harvard University, Princeton University, Columbia University, and various LGBTQ conferences across the United States. They worked for the United Nations Foundation, the Human Rights Campaign, and the Astraea Lesbian Foundation for Justice before starting a career in television.

In September 2013, Tobia raised over $10,000 for the Ali Forney Center running across the Brooklyn Bridge in five-inch heels as part of their Clinton Global Initiative University (CGI U) commitment to action. They were recently honored again for their larger impact on the LGBTQIA+ community by CGI U in 2018 at the University of Chicago.

Tobia was featured in MTV's The T Word, where they were interviewed by Laverne Cox. In 2015, Tobia was profiled in the GLAAD Award-nominated episode of True Life: I'm Genderqueer by MTV. In 2016 they were named in Out's 100. Later in 2016, Tobia created, co-produced, and hosted Queer 2.0, an original LGBTQ series for NBC News.

In 2017, Tobia moved from New York to Los Angeles to begin working on Season 4 of Joey Soloway's series Transparent. Tobia also provided the voice of Double Trouble in season 4 of She-Ra and the Princesses of Power.

In 2018, Tobia became the face of an advertising campaign for the gender non-conforming makeup brand Fluide, promoting a line of lip colors named after queer spaces, such as gay bars.

Sissy 

In June 2017, Tobia announced the release of a memoir titled Sissy. The book sold in a six-figure deal to Putnam Books. Sissy was released in March 2019 and was a National Bestseller. Tobia was featured as a guest on Trevor Noah's The Daily Show to promote the book. They discussed the term "gender chill," gendered violence, and the playful nature of non-binary genders. Sissy was well-received by The New York Times Book Review, which compared Tobia to David Sedaris and Mindy Kaling. They wrote, "[Tobia] combines incisive wit and undeniable intelligence to invite readers into their journey as a gender-nonconforming young person in North Carolina...If Tobia aspires to the ranks of comic memoirists like David Sedaris and Mindy Kaling, Sissy succeeds."

In November 2019, Showtime announced they are developing a half-hour show based on Tobia's memoir Sissy: A Coming-of-Gender Story. Tobia will serve as co-writer and co-executive producer for the adaptation alongside Michael Lannan, the co-creator of the HBO series, Looking. The series will follow the life of Tobi Gibran, a non-binary student who moves from North Carolina to New York City.

Personal life
Tobia identifies as genderqueer and uses singular they pronouns.

Bibliography

 Transgender Today: Jacob Tobia for The New York Times
I am neither Mr, Mrs nor Ms but Mx for The Guardian
Everything You Ever Wanted to Know About Gender-Neutral Pronouns for Motto by Time
An Open Letter to North Carolina's Lawmakers from a Trans North Carolinian for Women's Health
Telling Trans Stories Beyond 'Born in the Wrong Body for BuzzFeed
I Have Long Nails Because I'm Proud Of What They Mean for BuzzFeed
The 1970s Feminist Who Warned Against Leaning In for BuzzFeed
An Affront against All Women for New America Weekly
Trans Fashion is Not (Necessarily) Trans Empowerment for Hooligan Magazine
How Student Activists at Duke Transformed a $6 Billion Endowment for The Nation
Where I Belong for Duke Magazine
LGBTQIA: A Beginner's Guide to the Great Alphabet Soup Of Queer Identity for Mic
To All the Married Gay Couples Out There: The Fight Doesn't End With DOMA's Ruling for Mic
Obama Morehouse Speech: Was the President Unintentionally Transphobic? for Mic
The Power of Trans Vulnerability for The Huffington Post
Five Dos and Five Don'ts for College Seniors (From a Point Scholar Who's Been There) for The Huffington Post
Dear Mr. President: Students Ask Obama to Protect LGBT Employees for The Huffington Post
Why You Should Be Optimistic After Amendment One: A North Carolinian's Perspective for The Huffington Post
Why I'm Genderqueer, Professional and Unafraid for The Huffington Post
The Orlando Shooting Was An Act Of Hate for MTV
How To Talk To Your Parents About Being Genderqueer for MTV
I'm Genderqueer — Please Stop Asking Me When I'm 'Really' Going To Transition for MTV
Jacob Tobia - Promoting a “Gender-Chill” Exploration of Identity with “Sissy” | The Daily Show with Trevor Noah

References

External links

Living people
1991 births
American non-binary actors
Activists from North Carolina
American people of Syrian descent
American television hosts
American television producers
American voice actors
Duke University alumni
People with non-binary gender identities
American LGBT broadcasters
LGBT Methodists
LGBT producers
LGBT people from North Carolina
American LGBT rights activists
Queer feminists
Queer writers
Queer actors
Transfeminists
People from Raleigh, North Carolina
Non-binary activists
American non-binary writers